The 1991 Indian Challenge was an invitational non-ranking snooker tournament held in India in 1991. Stephen Hendry won the title, defeating John Parrott 9–5 in the final, and received £20,000 prize money. Parrott compiled the highest  of the tournament, 132, in the semi-final, having made a 127 break in the preceding frame.

Results

References

1991 in snooker
Sport in India